Dream Mall, located in Cianjhen District, Kaohsiung, Taiwan, is the largest shopping mall in Taiwan and the 15th largest in East Asia (formerly the largest). It is built and operated by Tungcheng Development Corporation, a subsidiary of Uni-President Enterprises Corporation, Taiwan's largest food conglomerate that also runs subsidiaries in many other industries. It was designed by international architecture firm RTKL, based in Baltimore, Maryland and opened on 12 May 2007, and contains restaurants, movie theater, gym, and entertainment facilities including a rooftop amusement park.

Ferris wheel
The rooftop amusement park at Dream Mall is the home of the Kaohsiung Eye Ferris wheel.

Transportation
The mall is served by Dream Mall light rail station of the LRT and accessible within walking distance west from Kaisyuan metro station of the Kaohsiung MRT.

See also
 List of largest buildings in the world
 List of tourist attractions in Taiwan
 E-Da Outlet Mall
 Taroko Park

References

External links

 

2007 establishments in Taiwan
Amusement parks in Kaohsiung
Shopping malls established in 2007
Shopping malls in Kaohsiung